Brigadier-General George Colborne Nugent,  (22 February 1864 – 31 May 1915) was a British Army officer who served on the staff during the Second Boer War, was closely involved in training the Territorial Force, and was killed in action in the Great War.

Early life
George Colborne was born on 22 February 1864, the eldest son of Sir Edmund Charles Nugent, 3rd Baronet of Waddesdon (1839–1928) and his wife Evelyn Henrietta Gascoigne. He was educated at Eton.

Military career
Nugent entered the Royal Military College, Sandhurst, in 1884 and on passing out in February 1885 was commissioned as a lieutenant into the Grenadier Guards.

Promoted to captain in 1897, Nugent served with the 3rd Battalion, Grenadier Guards, at Gibraltar before being appointed aide-de-camp to Major-General Sir Henry Colville, commanding the infantry brigade at Gibraltar in March 1899.

Second Boer War
In October 1899 Nugent and his brigadier were transferred to Cape Colony as part of the troop build-up for the Second Boer War. Colville took command of the 1st (Guards) Brigade in Lord Methuen's 1st Division, with Nugent as his aide-de-camp.

Advancing to relieve Kimberley at the beginning of the war, Methuen attempted a night attack at Belmont on 22–23 November 1899. He sent Colville off with his brigade to assault Gun Hill; although the attack was a failure, Nugent received his first Mention in Dispatches for his work that night. He distinguished himself again at the Battle of Modder River and was present at the Battle of Magersfontein.

When Colville was promoted to command the 9th Division, Nugent went with him and served at the battles of Poplar Grove and Driefontein. However, in May 1900, while Lord Roberts was closing in on Johannesburg, a Yeomanry battalion under Colville's command was cut off and forced to surrender; Colville was made a scapegoat and sent home. Nugent also returned to the UK, because he had been appointed with the rank of major as one of the first officers of the Irish Guards, newly-forming in London.

Service in London
In 1901 Nugent was made Commandant of the School of Instruction for Officers of the Auxiliary Forces. Based at Chelsea Barracks, it provided training for the part-time officers of the militia, yeomanry and volunteers. In May 1908 he was promoted to lieutenant-colonel and took command of the 1st Battalion, Irish Guards. As commander of the 1st Irish Guards, Nugent was appointed a Member of the Royal Victorian Order (MVO) by King Edward VII in January 1909.

Nugent became commander of the regiment and the regimental district in July 1909. This brought him the rank of temporary colonel, and also made him ex-officio commander of the 5th London Infantry Brigade in the Territorial Force, newly formed from the Volunteers. The 5th London Brigade comprised four battalions (17th–20th) of the London Regiment and formed part of the 2nd London Division. He was promoted to substantive colonel in December 1911.

On completion of his four-year term commanding the district and brigade, Nugent was appointed Commandant of the Duke of York's Royal Military School at Dover.

First World War
Nugent was still Commandant when war broke out. When Charles Fitzclarence, VC (who had succeeded him in command of the Irish Guards and the 5th London Brigade) was transferred to command the 1st (Guards) Brigade in the British Expeditionary Force, Nugent was brought back to command 5th London Brigade.

In October 1914, the 2nd London Division was selected for service on the Western Front, and progressive training was carried out through the winter. Nugent's 5th London Brigade was the leading element of the division to land in France on 9 and 10 March 1915. In May the division (already known in France simply as 'The London Division' to distinguish it from the Regular Army 2nd Division) took its place in the line and was designated the 47th (1/2nd London) Division, with the brigades numbered consecutively: the 5th London became the 141st (1/5th London) Brigade.

The 47th Division took part in fighting at the battles of Aubers Ridge (9 May) and Festubert (15–25 May), but the 141st Brigade was only marginally involved. During a quiet period of trench-holding, Nugent was killed by a stray bullet on 31 May. He is buried in Bethune Town Cemetery in France.

Family life
Nugent married Isabel Bulwer, daughter of General Sir Edward Gascoigne Bulwer in 1891. She died in 1941 They had two sons:

 George Nugent, born 5 November 1892, Captain and Adjutant of 3rd Bn Grenadier Guards in the First World War, succeeded his grandfather as the 4th Baronet in 1928 and died in 1970.
 Terence Edmund Gascoigne Nugent, Lieutenant, Irish Guards in 1915, later Lt-Col, created Baron Nugent in 1960. In 1935 he married Rosalie Heathcote-Drummond-Willoughy, daughter of Brig.-Gen Charles Strathavon Heathcote-Drummond-Willoughby, who had commanded 6th London Bde alongside Nugent's brigade in 2nd London Division.

Notes

References
 Maj A.F. Becke,History of the Great War: Order of Battle of Divisions, Part 2a: The Territorial Force Mounted Divisions and the 1st-Line Territorial Force Divisions (42–56), London: HM Stationery Office, 1935/Uckfield: Naval & Military Press, 2007, .
 Louis Creswicke, South Africa and the Transvaal War, Vol II: From the Commencement of the War to the Battle of Colenso, 15 December 1899, Edinburgh, 1900 
 Alan H. Maude (ed.), The History of the 47th (London) Division 1914–1919, London: Amalgamated Press, 1922/Uckfield: Naval & Military Press, 2002, .
 Stephen M. Miller, Lord Methuen and the British Army: Failure and Redemption in South Africa, London: Frank Cass, 1999, ..

External sources
 London Gazette.
 The Sandhurst Collection.
 Anglo-Boer War.com

1864 births
1915 deaths
People educated at Eton College
Graduates of the Royal Military College, Sandhurst
Grenadier Guards officers
Irish Guards officers
British Army personnel of the Second Boer War
British Army generals of World War I
Members of the Royal Victorian Order
British military personnel killed in World War I
British Army brigadiers
Burials in France
Territorial Force officers